Henricus glaesarius is a species of moth of the family Tortricidae. It is found in Venezuela.

The wingspan is about 24 mm. The ground colour of the forewings is pale ochreous cream, dotted with brown, suffused with ochreous basally and near the dorsum and mixed with rust in the posterior half of the wing. The hindwings are cream, slightly tinged with brownish at the apex.

Etymology
The species name refers to the colouration of the forewing and is derived from glaesarius (meaning of amber colour).

References

Moths described in 2006
Henricus (moth)